Thomas Moore (born October 8, 1940, in Detroit, Michigan) is a psychotherapist, former monk, and writer of popular spiritual books, including the New York Times bestseller Care of the Soul (1992), a "guide to cultivating depth and sacredness in everyday life". He writes and lectures in the fields of archetypal psychology, mythology, and imagination. His work is influenced by the writings of Carl Jung and James Hillman.

Early life and education 
Moore was born to an Irish Catholic family in Detroit, Michigan. At age 13, he joined the prep seminary of the Servites, a Roman Catholic lay order, where he studied philosophy and music. However, he left the order 13 years later, just before his ordination as a priest.

Moore earned a B.A. from DePaul University in Chicago, an M.A. in musicology from the University of Michigan, an M.A. in theology from the University of Windsor, Ontario, and in 1975, a Ph.D. in religion from Syracuse University. He taught at Glassboro State College and then Southern Methodist University. Denial of tenure at SMU launched Moore's next career.

Career 
From 1974 to 1990, Moore practiced as a psychotherapist, first in Dallas, Texas, and later in New England. After the success of Care of the Soul: Guide for Cultivating Depth and Sacredness in Everyday Life (1992) and its companion volume Soul Mates: Honoring the Mysteries of Love and Relationship (1994), he became a full-time writer who lectures internationally about spirituality, ecology, psychotherapy, and religion. He is also a columnist with The Huffington Post, and Spirituality & Health Magazine and Beliefnet.

Personal life 
He lives in New Hampshire with his wife, the artist Hari Kirin (born Joan Hanley), whom he met at Lesley College, where she was a student in his art therapy class. They have two children.

Bibliography

Books
 The Planets Within: Ficino's Astrological Psychology. Bucknell University Press. 1982. 
 
 
  .
 
  .
 
  .
  .
 
 
 
  .
 
 
  .
 
  .

Articles

See also 
 Analytical psychology
 Carl Jung
 James Hillman

References

External links
Official site: thomasmooresoul.com
Barque: Thomas Moore A blog dedicated to Moore's work

Whole Terrain link to Moore's articles published in Whole Terrain

1940 births
Living people
American psychotherapists
American Roman Catholic religious writers
American spiritual writers
American people of Irish descent
DePaul University alumni
Writers from Detroit
Rowan University faculty
Southern Methodist University faculty
Syracuse University alumni
University of Michigan School of Music, Theatre & Dance alumni
University of Windsor alumni
American columnists
Jungian psychologists